Left Hand Spring was a well-known watering stop on the old Chisholm Trail in present-day Blaine County, Oklahoma. The spring was named for Left Hand, an Arapaho chief. Jesse Chisholm died there in 1868 and is buried nearby. His grave is marked with a granite historical marker.

References

External links
Map: 

Bodies of water of Blaine County, Oklahoma
Springs of Oklahoma